Eochelone is an extinct genus of sea turtle from the late Eocene. It was first named by Dollo in 1903. Its type species is E. brabantica.

References
 Professor Paul's Guide to Reptiles
 Eochelone in the Paleobiology Database
 
 

Chelonioidea
Eocene turtles
Fossils of Denmark
Prehistoric turtle genera
Monotypic prehistoric reptile genera